Sheykhdarabad Rural District is in the Central District of Mianeh County, East Azerbaijan province, Iran. At the National Census of 2006, its population was 2,372 in 503 households. There were 2,308 inhabitants in 653 households at the following census of 2011. At the most recent census of 2016, the population of the rural district was 1,799 in 544 households. The largest of its four villages was Sheykhdarabad, with 1,681 people.

References 

Meyaneh County

Rural Districts of East Azerbaijan Province

Populated places in East Azerbaijan Province

Populated places in Meyaneh County